David Edward Aune (born 1939) is an American New Testament scholar. He is the emeritus Walter Professor of New Testament and Christian Origins at the University of Notre Dame.

Aune studied at Wheaton College, the University of Minnesota, and the University of Chicago. He taught at Saint Xavier College and Loyola University Chicago before taking up an appointment at the University of Notre Dame.

Aune is a fellow of the Royal Norwegian Society of Sciences and Letters and of the Norwegian Academy of Science and Letters. In 2006, a Festschrift was published in his honor. The New Testament and Early Christian Literature in Greco-Roman Context:  Studies in Honor of David E. Aune included contributions from Peder Borgen, Robert M. Grant, and Margaret M. Mitchell. In 2012, Aune was named honorary president for life of the Chicago Society of Biblical Research.

Aune is a member of the Evangelical Lutheran Church in America.

Works

Books

as Editor

Articles & Chapters

References

Living people
1939 births
20th-century Christian biblical scholars
21st-century Christian biblical scholars
American biblical scholars
New Testament scholars
Wheaton College (Illinois) alumni
University of Minnesota alumni
University of Chicago alumni
Loyola University Chicago faculty
University of Notre Dame faculty
Royal Norwegian Society of Sciences and Letters
Members of the Norwegian Academy of Science and Letters
Evangelical Lutheran Church in America Christians
Place of birth missing (living people)
Lutheran biblical scholars